Éva Óvári (born 28 April 1962) is a Hungarian gymnast. She competed at the 1976 Summer Olympics and the 1980 Summer Olympics.

References

1962 births
Living people
Hungarian female artistic gymnasts
Olympic gymnasts of Hungary
Gymnasts at the 1976 Summer Olympics
Gymnasts at the 1980 Summer Olympics
Sportspeople from Dunaújváros